Ye Booke of Monstres II, More Nightmares for Call of Cthulhu is a 1995 tabletop role-playing game supplement, written by Scott David Aniolowski, and with a cover by Eric Vogt, for Call of Cthulhu published by Chaosium.

Contents
Ye Booke of Monstres II is a book of monsters, some of which have been taken from various CoC supplements and adventures, and some of which were new.

Reception
Steve Faragher reviewed Ye Booke of Monstres II for Arcane magazine, rating it a 3 out of 10 overall. Faragher comments that "This is for Cthulhu completists only, and even he or she will be disappointed to find that they may have already bought half the material."

Reviews
Dragon #240 (Oct., 1997)

References

Call of Cthulhu (role-playing game) supplements
Role-playing game supplements introduced in 1995